Ptyctolaemus chindwinensis is a species of agamid lizard. It is endemic to Myanmar.

References

Ptyctolaemus
Reptiles of Myanmar
Reptiles described in 2021